Horton and Port Eynon Lifeboat Station (based in Horton, Swansea, Wales) opened in 1884 and was originally based in Port Eynon.

The current station in Horton operates a D class lifeboat named Albert Wordley.

History

The first station opened in 1884 in Port Eynon after successive tragedies along the coast resulted in a large death toll. The RNLI decided a lifeboat should be stationed further west than The Mumbles Lifeboat Station and chose Port Eynon for the location.

A boathouse was built on the west end of Port Eynon Bay to house the lifeboat A Daughter's Offering. This building is now used as a Youth Hostel by the YHA. A Daughter's Offering had a successful 22 years of service, saving 39 lives in total. In 1906, A Daughter's Offering had reached the end of her useful life, so a new lifeboat was provided.

The new lifeboat, Janet served for 10 years, saving a total of 15 lives. Tragedy struck on 1 January 1916. Janet responded to a distress signal from the S.S. Dunvegan and while making her way to the vessel was capsized by a large wave. Although the lifeboat automatically righted itself, one crewmember could not make it back onboard and drowned. Janet then capsized again and another two crewmembers had been lost overboard and could not be found. The lifeboat had lost all of its oars at this point and could do nothing but drift towards Mumbles.

Due to this tragedy, the lifeboat station was closed. A sculpture commemorating the lost crew of the Janet is in the churchyard of Port Eynon Church, and there is a plaque inside the church.

In 1968, the RNLI determined that there was a new need for a lifeboat station in this area, and so allocated a D class lifeboat to a new station based close to the beach in Horton. The new station still operates; a new boathouse was built in 1992.

Fleet

All Weather Boats

Inshore lifeboats

Station Honours
 Bronze Medal - 1973
 Thanks of the Institution Inscribed on Vellum x 2 - 1973
 Thanks of the Institution Inscribed on Vellum - 1974
 Framed Letter of Thanks - 1999
 MBE - 2001
 MBE - 2015 New Year Honours - Steve Davies

References

External links
Horton and Port Eynon Lifeboat Station (RNLI website)

Lifeboat stations in Wales
Transport infrastructure completed in 1884
Gower Peninsula